Tumor necrosis factor receptor 1 (TNFR1), also known as tumor necrosis factor receptor superfamily member 1A (TNFRSF1A) and CD120a, is a ubiquitous membrane receptor that binds tumor necrosis factor-alpha (TNFα).

Function 
The protein encoded by this gene is a member of the tumor necrosis factor receptor superfamily, which also contains TNFRSF1B. This protein is one of the major receptors for the tumor necrosis factor-alpha. This receptor can activate the transcription factor NF-κB, mediate apoptosis, and function as a regulator of inflammation. Antiapoptotic protein BCL2-associated athanogene 4 (BAG4/SODD) and adaptor proteins TRADD and TRAF2 have been shown to interact with this receptor, and thus play regulatory roles in the signal transduction mediated by the receptor.

Clinical significance 

Germline mutations of the extracellular domains of this receptor were found to be associated with the human genetic disorder called tumor necrosis factor associated periodic syndrome (TRAPS) or periodic fever syndrome.  Impaired receptor clearance is thought to be a mechanism of the disease.

Mutations in the TNFRSF1A gene are associated with elevated risk of multiple sclerosis.

Serum levels of TNFRSF1A are elevated in schizophrenia and bipolar disorder, and high levels are associated with more severe psychotic symptoms.

High serum levels are also associated with cognitive impairment and dementia.

Interactions 

TNFRSF1A has been shown to interact with:

 BAG4, 
 CASP10, 
 FADD, 
 IKK2, 
 JAK1, 
 JAK2, 
 PIP4K2B, 
 PSMD2, 
 RIPK1, 
 SUMO1,
 TRADD 
 TRAF2, 
 TRPC4AP, 
 TNF,  and
 UBE2I.

See also 
 Cluster of differentiation
 TNF receptor associated periodic syndrome

References

Further reading

External links 
 
 

Clusters of differentiation
TNF receptor family